P Se PM Tak is a Bollywood film directed by Kundan Shah. The film stars Meenakshi Dixit in the lead role. Dixit, who has appeared in several Tamil, Telugu and Malayalam films, plays a prostitute in the film which also features Indrajeet Soni, Bharat Jadhav, Yashpal Sharma, Aanjjan Srivastav. The film was earlier titled Masquerade, but later changed to P Se PM Tak. The film released on 4 April 2014.

Synopsis
P Se PM Tak is a political satire on modern Indian politics. A penniless prostitute arrives in a town where a by-election is taking place and gets caught up in the politics, eventually becoming chief minister.

Cast
 Meenakshi Dixit
 Indrajeet Soni
 Bharat Jadhav
 Yashpal Sharma
 Aanjjan Srivastav
 Vedish
 Chinmay Jadhav
 Aakash Pandey
 Akhilendra Mishra
 Prerna Wanvari
 Deepak Shirke
 Mushtaq Khan
 Upasana Singh
 Virendra Saxena
 Aanand Kale
 Pandharinath Kamble
 Rocky Verma
 Rana Norana
 Sanjay Dadhich

Soundtrack

The music for the film is composed by Jatin Pandit and lyrics by Vinoo Mahendra. The soundtrack of the film comprises 2 songs. The full audio album of the film was released on 21 May 2015 on YouTube.

References

External links
 

2010s Hindi-language films
Indian black comedy films
Indian satirical films
Films about corruption in India
2014 comedy-drama films
Films directed by Kundan Shah